The Scullin ministry (Labor) was the 19th ministry of the Government of Australia. It was led by the country's 9th Prime Minister, James Scullin. The Scullin ministry succeeded the Third Bruce ministry, which dissolved on 22 October 1929 following the federal election that took place on 12 October which saw Labor defeat Stanley Bruce's Nationalist–Country Coalition. The ministry was replaced by the First Lyons ministry on 6 January 1932 following the federal election that took place in December which saw the United Australia Party defeat Labor. , it remains the most recent government to have lost an election after a single term in office.

Frank Forde, who died in 1983, was the last surviving member of the Scullin ministry; Forde was also the last surviving minister of the Curtin government, the Forde government, and the First Chifley ministry.

Ministry

Assistant ministers

Notes

Ministries of George V
Australian Commonwealth ministries
Australian Labor Party ministries
1929 establishments in Australia
1932 disestablishments in Australia
Cabinets established in 1929
Cabinets disestablished in 1932